Dan Davies is a Canadian politician, who was elected to the Legislative Assembly of the 41st Parliament of British Columbia in the 2017 provincial election. He represents the riding of Peace River North as a member of the British Columbia Liberal Party caucus.

Prior to his election to the legislature, Davies was as a Fort St. John City Councillor since 2005, he has a master's degree in Leadership from Gonzaga University and a Bachelor of Education from Simon Fraser University. He was also an elementary school teacher at Duncan Cran and truck driver.

Electoral record

References

External links 

 MLA: Dan Davies

British Columbia Liberal Party MLAs
Living people
British Columbia municipal councillors
Canadian schoolteachers
Gonzaga University alumni
People from Fort St. John, British Columbia
Simon Fraser University alumni
Canadian truck drivers
21st-century Canadian politicians
Year of birth missing (living people)